Karnataka Chitrakala Parishath is a visual art complex located in Bangalore. The complex has 18 galleries. 13 of these galleries carry a permanent collection of paintings, sculptures and folk art. The other galleries are rented out for exhibitions of works by artists of repute. The folk art collection showcases Mysore paintings and leather puppets. The Parishat runs the College of Fine Arts, a visual arts college. Each January, the Parishath organizes Chitra Santhe, a cultural event showcasing affordable art to the public.  The motto of the event is "Art for All".

History

The Parishath started off on a two-and-a-half acres of land leased by the Government of Karnataka, with initial donations from H. K. Kejriwal, an industrialist.  Svetoslav Roerich donated several of his paintings and those of his father Nicholas Roerich to the Parishath. In 1964, Nanjunda Rao's Chitrakala Vidyalaya was added to the Parishath. In 1966, it obtained recognition as an art-centre by the state and national Lalit Kala Akademi.  The Parishath pioneered a survey of the Karnataka state's art treasures such as the famous Mysore paintings. In time, the Parishath added galleries and a graphic studio, making it into a full-fledged art complex.  In 1995, Kejriwal donated his family's art collection, which was displayed in spacious galleries in the Parishath. In 1998-99, a sculpture gallery was added to the Parishath complex. An open-air theatre to cater to the needs of the visual and performing artists is also present. In 2003, two more large galleries for international and folk art were inaugurated.

Publications 

The Parishath regularly publishes books on art and culture.  Notable among these are:

 Mysore chitramālā : traditional paintings
 Humanism in art
 Gaṇapatīya rūpagaḷu and Gaṇapati : 32 drawings from a 19th cent. scroll
 Y. Subramanya Raju centenary celebration : [catalogue of paintings on occasion of Sri Y. Subramanya Raju centenary celebration]

References

External links 
 Karnataka Chitrakala Parishath
 College of Fine Arts

Museums in Bangalore
Art museums and galleries in Bangalore